The Montreal Xtreme were a women's soccer club based in Montreal, Quebec, Canada. They played only the 2004 season in the W-League. The team played its home games in Soccerplexe Catalogna in Lachine, Quebec. The team's colours were blue and white. The team folded after the 2004 season.

2004 squad

Staff

    Montreal Xtreme's owner and president: David Craig
    Head coach: Alexandre Da Rocha
    Assistant coach: Lyonel Joseph
    Assistant coach (goalkeepers): Owen Braun

Notable players
 Karina LeBlanc, member of the Canada national team.
 Sharolta Nonen, former member of the Canada national team.
 Marie-Ève Nault, member of the Canada national team.
 Amy Walsh, member of the Canada national team.
 Véronique Maranda, member of the Canada national team.
 Isabelle Morneau, member of the Canada national team.
 Josée Bélanger, member of the Canada national team.

Season standing

North Central Division regular season

Match by match

May 2004 
Sunday 	 May 23 	5:00 pm 	Toronto Inferno 	1:4 	Montreal Xtrem at Soccerplex Catalogna,   Attendance: 1634
Saturday 	 May 29 	2:00 pm 	Sudbury Canadians 	0:4 	Montreal Xtreme 	at Soccerplex Catalogna, Attendance: 1170
June 2004 
Saturday 	 Jun 5 	3:00 pm 	Montreal Xtreme 	7:0 	Sudbury Canadians 	at Cambrian College, Attendance: 429
Sunday 	 June 13 	2:00 pm 	Boston Renegades 	4:1 	Montreal Xtreme at Soccerplex Catalogna, Attendance: 1240
Friday 	 June 18 	7:30 pm 	Montreal Xtreme 	2:1 	Western Mass Lady Pioneers 	at Lusitano Stadium, Attendance: 726
Sunday 	 June 20 	6:00 pm 	New York Magic 	0:5 	Montreal Xtreme 	at Claude Robillard Sports Complex, Attendance: 831
Wednesday 	 June 23 	6:00 pm 	Montreal Xtreme 	1:2 	Ottawa Fury 	at Keith Harris Stadium, Attendance: 900
Saturday 	 June 26 	4:00 pm 	New Hampshire Lady Phantoms 	0:7 	Montreal Xtreme 	at Soccerplex Catalogna
July 2004 
Friday 	 July 2 	6:30 pm 	Montreal Xtreme 	3:2 	Rochester Ravens at Rochester Institute of Technology, Attendance: 157
Saturday July 3 	7:00 pm 	Montreal Xtreme 	1:0 	Toronto Inferno 	at Ontario Soccer Centre, Attendance: 420
Sunday 	 July 11 	5:00 pm 	Montreal Xtreme 	10:1 	Rhode Island Lady Stingrays at Pierce Memorial, Attendance: 102
Sunday 	 July 18 	2:00 pm 	Rochester Ravens 	0:4 	Montreal Xtreme 	at Soccerplex Catalogna, Attendance: 1357
Wednesday July 21 	7:00 pm 	Ottawa Fury 	2:3 	Montreal Xtreme 	at Soccerplex Catalogna, Attendance: 1056
Saturday July 24 	7:30 pm 	Montreal Xtreme 	5:6 	Long Island Lady Riders 	 at Stony Brook University Stadium, Attendance: 924

Playoffs 2004 Eastern Conference 

Divisional round match 

Conference semifinal match 

Conference final match

References

External news story
  Montreal Xtreme Launch Inaugural Season In the W-League in Canada soccer website, 14 January 2004.
 Leblanc And Morneau Sign With Xtreme in Canada Soccer website, 17 May 2004.

External links
 Montreal Xtreme roster with players stats in USL website, 2004.
 W-League 2004 in USL website, 2004
 Montreal Xtreme standing in W-League in USL website, 2004.

Xtr
Soccer clubs in Quebec
Defunct soccer clubs in Canada
Women's soccer clubs in Canada
Defunct USL W-League (1995–2015) teams
United Soccer League teams based in Canada
2004 establishments in Quebec
2004 disestablishments in Quebec
Association football clubs established in 2004
Association football clubs disestablished in 2004